Maurizio Vella (born 10 May 1991) is an Italian football player. He plays the forward position. He also holds German citizenship.

Club career
He made his Serie C debut for Juve Stabia on 30 August 2014 in a game against Catanzaro.

References

External links
 

1991 births
Footballers from Mannheim
Living people
Italian footballers
S.S. Juve Stabia players
L'Aquila Calcio 1927 players
Paganese Calcio 1926 players
Floriana F.C. players
Al Hamriyah Club players
Serie C players
Serie D players
Maltese Premier League players
UAE First Division League players
Italian expatriate footballers
Association football forwards
Expatriate footballers in Malta
Expatriate footballers in the United Arab Emirates